Serravalle Pistoiese is a comune (municipality) in the Province of Pistoia in the Italian region Tuscany, located about  northwest of Florence and about  southwest of Pistoia.

History

The original settlement consisted of two cones, those of S. Maria and Nievole, the fortress was built by the New Lucchesi in 1302. Casttrum of talking in an old inventory of the assets of the town of Pistoia dated around 1380, this document is listed in the Castrum Serravallis cum walls turribus September muratis circumcirca et cum duabus januis.

Main sights

Church of San Michele Arcangelo. It houses a 14th-century Miracle of St. Blaise and a triptych with Madonna Enthroned with Child and Saints (1438), by Bartolomeo di Andrea Bocchi.
Barbarossa (Lombard) Tower
Church of Santo Stefano
Oratory of San Rocco e San Sebastiano, with fragment of 14th-century fresco decoration
Church of St. Peter, in the frazione of Casalguidi. It houses some 16th-century paintings.
Rocca Nuova, or Rocca di  Castruccio, a medieval castle.

Twin towns
Serravalle Pistoiese is twinned with:

  Uzerche, France
  Grafenwörth, Austria

References

External links

 Proloco official website

Cities and towns in Tuscany